The Hessenpark is an open-air museum in Neu-Anspach (near Wehrheim-Obernhain), Hesse, Germany. It was founded in 1974 by the Hesse State Government headed by Albert Osswald (SPD).

The museum showcases half-timbered buildings from the land of Hesse. As of 2006, there were almost 100 houses on display.

The Hessenpark is a popular family destination.

Concept 
One of the major goals of Hessenpark museum is to preserve and display traditional buildings from various regions around the state of Hesse. Exhibits are grouped into "Baugruppen" (building ensembles) that represent the way these buildings may have been found in their original locations, such as villages, farmsteads or workshops, often including historical furniture, tools and machinery. 

Due to cultural heritage management laws in Germany, traditional buildings can only be moved or demolished under exceptional circumstances. Hessenpark represents one of the ways in which such a building may avoid demolition. In this case, the building is carefully deconstructed, moved to the museum grounds and re-erected.  In this manner, the museum is able to provide its visitors with new exhibits on a regular basis.

Other goals of Hessenpark include

 to give an impression of typical village life in Hesse over the last centuries
 to preserve knowledge about traditional building techniques and materials
 to preserve and display crafts and trades typical for the region, such as basket weaving, bread making, beekeeping, metalworking, charcoal burning and others
 to use and demonstrate traditional farming methods, grow traditional crops and vegetables and keep farm animals that would have been typical for the time period.

Besides the educational aspects, Hessenpark is frequently used for events such as weddings. It also offers an annual christmas market. The marktplatz building ensemble hosts several restaurants, shops and a goldsmith.

Landmarks
 the Village Church
 the Synagogue
 the Village School
 the Post Office
 the Market Place
 the Bakery
 the Windmills
 the Water Mill
 the Blacksmith's Shop
 the Typography

Image gallery

References

External links

  

Ethnographic museums in Germany
Rural history museums in Germany
Open-air museums in Germany
Museums established in 1974
Museums in Hesse
1974 establishments in West Germany
Taunus